Meredith McGrath and Larisa Savchenko were the defending champions but lost in the semifinals to Nicole Arendt and Manon Bollegraf.

Arendt and Bollegraf won in the final 6–3, 2–6, 7–6 against Gigi Fernández and Natasha Zvereva.

Seeds
Champion seeds are indicated in bold text while text in italics indicates the round in which those seeds were eliminated.

 Gigi Fernández /  Natasha Zvereva (final)
 Meredith McGrath /  Larisa Savchenko (semifinals)
 Nicole Arendt /  Manon Bollegraf (champions)
 Katrina Adams /  Mariaan de Swardt (semifinals)

Draw

External links
 1996 World Doubles Cup Draw

WTA Doubles Championships
1996 WTA Tour